Sten Söderberg (13 March 1893 – 1969) was a Swedish footballer and bandy player. He made nine appearances and scored three goals for Sweden national team. As a footballer, he played as an inside forward.

In 1921, Söderberg moved to the United States.

Sten Söderberg's brother Jean Söderberg also played for Djurgårdens IF Bandy and Djurgårdens IF Fotboll, while his other brother Herman Söderberg represented Järva IS.

Career
Söderberg represented Djurgården. He was part of the Svenska Mästerskapet winning teams of 1915, 1917, 1920.

Honours

Football 
Djurgårdens IF
 Svenska Mästerskapet (3): 1915, 1917, 1920

Bandy 
Djurgårdens IF
 Svenska Mästerskapet: 1912

References

External links 

1893 births
1969 deaths
Swedish footballers
Djurgårdens IF Fotboll players
Association football forwards
Sweden international footballers
Swedish bandy players
Djurgårdens IF Bandy players